Chhachi may refer to:

 something of, from, or related to Chhachh, a region of Pakistan
 Chhachi (Punjabi clan), an ethnic group of Pakistan
 Chhachi dialect, an Indo-Aryan dialect of Punjab, Pakistan

See also 
 Chachi (disambiguation)

Language and nationality disambiguation pages